Ron Barfield Jr. (born April 20, 1971) is an American former stock car racing driver. He raced in all of the major NASCAR series: Winston Cup, Busch Series, and Craftsman Truck Series, but did not win a race. He is a former protégé of Bill Elliott.

Beginnings 
Barfield began racing at the age of six in go-karts. In 1987, he won the World Karting Association's National Dirt Series Championship. Two years later, he switched to stock car racing and won nine races in a Late Model at Myrtle Beach Speedway. He would win the track championship at Myrtle Beach in 1991, collecting a total of 46 feature wins. In 1994, he was named the Texas Pete All-Pro Series Rookie of the Year, finishing fourth in points.

Early NASCAR 
In 1995, he moved to the Slim Jim All Pro Series, where he won two races and had sixteen top-ten starts in twenty-one starts. The next season, he began racing in the major NASCAR series. He made his debut in the Truck Series at Homestead-Miami Speedway, driving the #94 for Super 8 Motel Ford F-150 for Elliott, starting third and finishing fourth. He ran six more races in the trucks that season and had two additional top-ten finishes. He also ran six races in the Busch Series for Elliott's New Holland team, where his best finish was 11th. In addition, Barfield attempted the Brickyard 400 in the Cup series, but failed to qualify. He took home a victory at Michigan International Speedway in an Auto Racing Club of America as well.

Barfield returned to the trucks for another part-time run in 1997, finishing eighth at Walt Disney World Speedway. He also attempted to run in the Busch Series full-time with Elliott's team, and posted two ninth-place runs, but his schedule was eventually cut back. He ran two more truck races for Gloy Racing, before rounding out the schedule in a team owned by Elliott's partner, Charles Hardy. He also attempted again at Indianapolis in the Cup series, where he finished 22nd.

In 1998, Barfield went full-time with the Hardy team, with sponsorship from Ortho Lawn & Garden. He had ten top-tens and finished 9th in points. He also ran a pair of races in the #2 for Craven, his best finish a 21st at Bristol.

Final years 
Despite the success of 1998, Hardy's team closed its doors, and Barfield return to Gloy to pilot the #55 Icehouse Beer Ford. He had two top-tens but was released late in the year, and finished the season driving for Rick McCray. He started 2000 driving for his own team, but ran four more races, his worst finish a 27th. He made his final truck start the following year at Darlington Raceway, finishing 22nd in a truck owned by Team 23 Racing. After not racing in 2002, Barfield made seven Busch starts in 2003, the first five in a car owned by Stanton Barrett. After running two more races in the #73 car, Barfield disappeared from the NASCAR circuit. 

He now runs a racing shop in Timmonsville, SC and in 2006, purchased an overgrown site that once was the site of a four-tenths mile dirt track in nearby Dillon (1966-73, 1977-80).  Barfield rebuilt the track, paving it, where today it runs as the Dillon Motor Speedway, hosting local and national (PASS) (Super) Late Models.

Motorsports career results

NASCAR
(key) (Bold – Pole position awarded by qualifying time. Italics – Pole position earned by points standings or practice time. * – Most laps led.)

Winston Cup Series

Busch Series

Craftsman Truck Series

Winston West Series

ARCA Bondo/Mar-Hyde Series
(key) (Bold – Pole position awarded by qualifying time. Italics – Pole position earned by points standings or practice time. * – Most laps led.)

References

External links
 

1971 births
ARCA Menards Series drivers
Living people
NASCAR drivers
Sportspeople from Florence, South Carolina
Racing drivers from South Carolina